"Cry Baby Cry" is a 1968 song by the Beatles.

Cry Baby Cry may also refer to:
 "Cry Baby Cry" (Duran Duran song), 2007
 "Cry Baby Cry" (Santana song), 2005
 "Cry Baby Cry", 1982 single by Brotherhood of Man, featured on their album Lightning Flash

See also
Cry Baby (disambiguation)